Tamara Thorne (born 20 November 1957 in Los Angeles, California), who also writes under the pen name Chris Curry, is a well-known, bestselling American horror writer. Her novel Winter Scream, co-authored with L. Dean James, was nominated for the 1991 Bram Stoker Award for Best First Novel. She has authored nearly 20 novels, including two novel series, multiple anthologies and several stand-alone works. They tend to be set in the Los Angeles area, where she has lived since she was born.

Biography
Tamara Thorne was born in August 1957 in Los Angeles, California. She published her first novel, Winter Scream, in February 1991 under her pen name Chris Curry. The book was coauthored with L. Dean James. Since then, Thorne has authored nearly 20 novels, both standalone and in series. She authored two other series under her own name: the Sorority in 2003, and The Ghosts of Ravencrest series, coauthored with Alistair Cross (Jared S. Anderson), in 2014 and 2015.

Many of her books have sold strongly and she is well known in her chosen genre of horror.

Writing
According to the Los Angeles Times, Thorne's novels are set in "made-up burgs" on the edge of Los Angeles, but Californians see the town in Bad Things as sounding a lot like Redlands, California, where Hollywood stars used to live. Moonfall resembles Oak Glen, and the "scary high desert retreat" in Thunder Road is drawn from Calico Ghost Town. Thorn responds that "My natural mind-set is bound to Los Angeles and the Inland Empire,...and in my books I like to use history and folklore from the real places."

Reception
Thorne was nominated for the 1991 Bram Stoker Award for Best First Novel. The Horror Zine describes Thorne as being "a bestselling author between 1991 and 2002."  The Los Angeles Times describes her as a "successful practitioner [of] terror."

The British horror writer Graham Masterton named a character in his Forest Ghost novel for Thorne.

Bibliography

Novels
Haunted (1991, Pinnacle) (reviews:)
Moonfall (1996, Pinnacle)
Body House (1999, Pinnacle)
Candle Bay (2001, Pinnacle)
Eternity (2001, Pinnacle) (listed in The Year's Best Fantasy and Horror)
Bad Things (2002, Pinnacle)
The Forgotten (2002, Pinnacle) (review:)
The Cliffhouse Haunting (2015, Glass Apple Press (ebook), coauthored with Alistair Cross)

Sorority series
Eve (2003, Pinnacle)
Merilynn (2003, Pinnacle,  (hardcover),  (paperback))
Samantha (2003, Pinnacle,  (hardcover),  (paperback))
The Sorority (2013, Kensington ; trilogy reissue of all three "sorority" novels)

The Ghosts of Ravencrest series
These titles were coauthored with Alistair Cross.
Darker Shadows (2014,  Glass Apple Press (ebook))
Christmas Spirits (2014, Glass Apple Press (ebook))
Night Moves (2015, Glass Apple Press (ebook))
Dead Girls (2015, Glass Apple Press (ebook))

As Chris Curry
Winter Scream (1991, Pocket, coauthored with L. Dean James)
Trickster (1992, Pocket, coauthored with Lisa Dean)
Panic (1993, Pocket)
Thunder Road (1995, Pocket, was inspired by Calico Ghost Town. Reissued by Pinnacle in 2004. (review:)

Anthologies
These anthologies contain works by Thorne.
Dark Seductions (1993, Zebra)
The Devil's Wine (2004, Cemetery Dance Publications, collection of poetry)

Nonfiction
Ghosthunting Southern California: America's Haunted Road Trip with John B. Kachuba (2010, Clerisy)

References

External links
Interview about Ghosts of Ravencrest series on ''Haunted Nights LIVE"

1957 births
American horror writers
Writers from Los Angeles
Living people
American women poets
20th-century American novelists
21st-century American novelists
Women horror writers
American women novelists
20th-century American women writers
21st-century American women writers
20th-century American poets
21st-century American poets
Pseudonymous women writers
20th-century pseudonymous writers
21st-century pseudonymous writers